A Great Way to Care is a TVB medical drama series that premiered on 10 January 2011 in Hong Kong. The show follows Dr. Ko Lap-yan (Alex Fong, a dryly humorous and nonchalant criminal psychiatry expert who heads a team of psychiatrists at the fictional Yan Wo Hospital in Hong Kong. The series, told in a serialised format with two main story arcs, features Ko's team confronting different medical cases. The plot of each case spans from as short as one episode to four episodes. A Great Way to Care currently has two continuous series.

Series overview

Series 1 (2011) 
Produced in 2008, the first series premiered on TVB International's overseas cable affiliates on 8 June 2009, with 20 episodes. Although the series was slated to premiere in Hong Kong at around the same time, its broadcast was scrapped in order to make room to air Sweetness in the Salt. The entire first series of A Great Way to Care finally premiered in Hong Kong on 10 January 11. It was released as a 19-episode serial with two episodes back-to-back.

Series 2 (2013) 
A Great Way to Care was renewed for a second series in early 2012. The sequel is slated to premiere on 18 March 2013.

References

External links
Official website

Lists of Chinese drama television series episodes